The Spiderwick Chronicles is an upcoming American television series. It is based on the book of the same name by Tony DiTerlizzi and Holly Black. The series will be released on Disney+ and consists of six episodes.

Cast

Main
 Christian Slater as Mulgarath, an ogre with a plot to satisfy his hunger.
 Jack Dylan Grazer as Thimbletack
 Lyon Daniels as Jared Grace
 Noah Cottrell as Simon Grace
 Joy Bryant as Helen Grace
 Mychala Lee as Mallory Grace

Recurring
 Momona Tamada as Emiko
 Alyvia Alyn Lind as Calliope

Production 
On November 12, 2021, it was announced that a television adaptation was in development for Disney+, with Aron Eli Coleite serving as writer and showrunner. The series will be a co-production between Paramount Television Studios and 20th Television. Work on the series began by February 2022. In May 2022, Kat Coiro joined as an executive producer and director for the first two episodes.

Christian Slater joined the cast as Mulgarath in August 2022. He is reportedly set to appear only through the first season. Later that month, Lyon Daniels and Noah Cottrell were added to the cast. On August 30, Joy Bryant joined the cast as Helen Grace. Mychala Lee joined as Mallory Grace in mid-September.

Principal photography began on September 12, 2022, in Vancouver, Canada, and was scheduled to wrap on January 27, 2023.

References

External links
 

English-language television shows
2020s American drama television series
2020s American television series debuts
Disney+ original programming
Television shows based on American novels
The Spiderwick Chronicles
Upcoming drama television series
Television series by Paramount Television
Television series by 20th Century Fox Television
Television shows filmed in Vancouver